The Frøya Tunnel is an undersea tunnel connecting the municipalities of Frøya and Hitra in Trøndelag county, Norway.

It begins in the village of Hammarvika on the island of Frøya and travels south under the Frøyfjorden to the island of Dolmøya in Hitra municipality.

References

Frøya, Trøndelag
Hitra
Road tunnels in Trøndelag
Subsea tunnels in Norway
2000 establishments in Norway
Tunnels completed in 2000
Former toll tunnels